Fahad Al-Obaid (born 3 November 1992) is a Saudi Arabian professional footballer who plays as a left back for Pro League side Al-Hazem.

Career
Al-Obaid started out his career at Sdoos. On 22 January 2019, Al-Obaid joined Al-Mujazzal. On 7 February 2021, Al-Obaid joined Al-Hazem. In his first season at the club he made 11 appearances as Al-Hazem were crowned champions of the MS League. On 12 September 2021, Al-Obaid made his Pro League debut in the 0–2 defeat against Al-Shabab.

Honours
Al-Hazem
MS League: 2020–21

References

External links
 
 

1992 births
Living people
Saudi Arabian footballers
Association football fullbacks
Saudi Fourth Division players
Saudi Second Division players
Saudi First Division League players
Saudi Professional League players
Sdoos Club players
Al-Mujazzal Club players
Al-Hazem F.C. players